"Come In Out of the Rain" is a song by American R&B singer Wendy Moten,  written by Ernest Williamson, Curtiss Boone, and Nikos Lyras, who also produced the song. The song was released as the second single from Moten's self-titled debut album in 1992. One of the tracks on the British and Australian CD singles, "Step by Step", was released as Moten's debut single.

A soul ballad, "Come In Out of the Rain" received positive reviews from music critics and became Moten's most successful hit, peaking at number 55 on the US Billboard Hot 100 and number 46 on the Canadian RPM Top Singles chart. In 1994, the song was released in Europe and Australia, reaching the top 10 in Iceland and the United Kingdom. Despite the song's success, Moten would release only one more successful album before being dropped by Capitol Records.

Critical reception
Chris Rizik of Soultracks gave the song a positive review, calling it "beautiful" and comparing it to ballads by fellow American R&B artist Whitney Houston.

Track listings

US 7-inch jukebox vinyl
A. "Come In Out of the Rain"
B. "A Matter of Fact"

US cassette single, UK 7-inch and cassette single
 "Come In Out of the Rain" – 4:04 (4:15 in UK)
 "Magic Touch" – 4:12

UK and Australian CD single
 "Come In Out of the Rain" – 4:15
 "Magic Touch" – 4:12
 "Step by Step" – 3:25

Charts

Weekly charts

Year-end charts

Release history

References

1990s ballads
1992 singles
1992 songs
1994 singles
American soul songs
Capitol Records singles
EMI Records singles
Soul ballads